Boophis tasymena is a species of frogs in the family Mantellidae endemic to Madagascar.

Its natural habitats are subtropical or tropical moist lowland forests and rivers.
It is threatened by habitat loss.

References

tasymena
Endemic frogs of Madagascar
Amphibians described in 2002
Taxonomy articles created by Polbot